Aeromonas allosaccharophila is a Gram-negative, catalase-positive, motile bacterium from the genus Aeromonas which was isolated from ill elvers (Anguilla anguilla) in Valencia, Spain.

References

External links
Type strain of Aeromonas allosaccharophila at BacDive -  the Bacterial Diversity Metadatabase

Aeromonadales
Bacteria described in 1992